Yevgeniya Aleksandrovna Startseva (born 12 February 1989) is a volleyball player from Russia. She was a member of the national team that won the gold medal at the 2010 World Championship.  She represented Russia at the 2012 Olympics.

Career
Startseva won a 2014 FIVB Club World Championship gold medal playing with the Russian club Dinamo Kazan, who defeated the Brazilian team Molico Osasco 3-0 in the championship match.

National team
 2009 FIVB World Grand Prix –  Silver medal (with Russia)
 2010 FIVB World Championship –  Gold medal (with Russia)
 2014 FIVB World Grand Prix –  Bronze medal (with Russia)
 2015 European Championship –  Gold medal (with Russia)
 2019 World Cup -  Bronze medal (with Russia)

Clubs
 Avtodor-Metar (2004–2010)
 Dinamo Krasnodar (2010-2012)
 Dinamo Kazan (2012-2021)
 Dynamo Moscow (2022-Present)

Awards
 Volleyball at the 2012 Summer Olympics – Women's tournament - Best setter
 2014 FIVB Club World Championship -  Champion, with Dinamo Kazan
 2016 Russian Cup –  Champion, with Dinamo Kazan
 2016–17 CEV Cup –  Champion, with Dinamo Kazan
 2016–17 Russian Championship –  Runner-Up, with Dinamo Kazan

References

External links
 Dynamo Kazan Profile

1989 births
Living people
Sportspeople from Chelyabinsk
Russian women's volleyball players
Volleyball players at the 2012 Summer Olympics
Olympic volleyball players of Russia
Volleyball players at the 2020 Summer Olympics
20th-century Russian women
21st-century Russian women